Joannes Miraeus,  Latinized from Jean Le Mire (1560–1611) was the fourth bishop of Antwerp.

Life
Le Mire was born in Brussels on 6 January 1560. He was educated in the city, and began studies at Louvain University, but due to the unsettled condition of the city during the Dutch Revolt moved to Douai University instead. At Douai he completed his Liberal Arts degree, taught Greek, and in 1588 graduated Licentiate of Sacred Theology. In 1591 he was appointed to Saint Jacques-sur-Coudenberg in Brussels, and not long afterwards became a canon of the collegiate church of St Gudula.

On 26 July 1603 he was appointed to the see of Antwerp, and on 30 May 1604 he was consecrated bishop by Mathias Hovius. As bishop he founded a diocesan seminary in Antwerp, and in 1610 called a synod to restore ecclesiastical order in the diocese. He also made efforts to support the Catholic population in the parts of his diocese under the hostile control of the Dutch Republic, and promoted the cult of Our Lady of Scherpenheuvel. He died of an apoplexy in Brussels in the night of 11–12 January 1611, having travelled to the city for the wedding of the Count of Hoogstraten to the daughter of the Count of Berlaimont.

References

 

1560 births
1611 deaths
University of Douai alumni
Academic staff of the University of Douai
17th-century Roman Catholic bishops in the Holy Roman Empire
Bishops of Antwerp